First Four EPs is the debut studio album by the band Off! which features former Black Flag and Circle Jerks singer Keith Morris. The four 7-inch EP vinyl box set collection was released on December 14, 2010, by Vice Records, the CD version followed on February 15, 2011, and both contain artwork by Raymond Pettibon. The album was produced by Dimitri Coats and recorded and mixed by Steven Shane McDonald.

Track listing
All songs written by Dimitri Coats and Keith Morris, unless noted.

Bonus tracks
 "Zero Hour" [iTunes exclusive bonus track] (Case) - 1:26
 "Sexy Capitalists" [eMusic exclusive bonus track] - 1:02

Personnel
Band
 Dimitri Coats – guitar, design
 Steven Shane McDonald – bass guitar
 Keith Morris – vocals
 Mario Rubalcaba – drums

Production
 Dimitri Coats – production
 JJ Golden – mastering
 Andrew Lynch – engineering, mixing
 Steven McDonald – engineering, mixing
 Raymond Pettibon – artwork, liner notes
 Sean Peterson – photography

References

External links 
 

2010 debut albums
Off! albums